Aldo Ferraresi (Ferrara, 14 May 1902 – San Remo, 29 June 1978) was a celebrated Italian concert violinist and violin pedagogue.

Life and career
Ferraresi was born in Ferrara, the son of Augusto Ferraresi (1868-1939), an artillery marshal and mandolin player, and Marcella Jesi. His mother was of Jewish origin.
At the age of five he began his studies at the Frescobaldi Institute of Music in Ferrara with Federico Barera and Umberto Supino. When he was 12, he was admitted to the Parma Conservatory. His teacher there, Mario Corti, also accompanied him to Rome where he received a degree in violin from the Accademia di Santa Cecilia three years later. Upon suggestions from Jan Kubelik, he went to Eugène Ysaÿe, who considered him one of his best pupils.
Starting from 1923 he was leader of "Aldo Ferraresi Chamber Orchestra" where, together with Marcello Cortopassi and professors of the "Rome Augusteo Orchestra", he played at Gran Caffé Margherita in Viareggio (Lucca).
He went on to perform in concert halls throughout Europe and the United States including La Scala in Milan, the Royal Festival Hall in London. In addition to his solo concert work, he was also first violin in the Quartet of San Remo and concertmaster at the Symphonic Orchestra of San Remo, as well at the Teatro San Carlo in Naples.
As teacher, he held the violin class at Music Conservatory "N.Piccinni" in Bari from October 1967 till 1973, when Nino Rota was the director.
Among his pupils we can remember Uto Ughi that studied with him privately in Naples for 7 years.
Aldo Ferraresi died in Sanremo on 29 June 1978. In May 2002, the 100th anniversary of his birth was marked by an exhibition and seminars in Ferrara and concerts in his honour in Ferrara at the Teatro Comunale.
Ferraresi played on many precious violins, among of them are the "King George" Stradivarius and the "Cannone" Guarneri of Paganini. His favourite instruments were a Camillo Camilli and an Alessandro Gagliano.

Family

Among the six brothers are Prospero Ferraresi (1908-1972), pianist and his accompanist from the 1920s to the 1940s, Sesto (Sexten) Ferraresi (1915-1984), dealer in musical instruments that lived in Berlin, and the younger, that was also his pupil, Cesare Ferraresi (Ferrara, 12 October 1918 – Milano, 9 January 1981) who was a renowned soloist, concertmaster at RAI Orchestra in Milano and member of "Trio di Milano" (with pianist Bruno Canino and cellist Rocco Filippini). From his marriage with Italia (Ione) Pecori, Aldo Ferraresi had two sons, both musicians, Marcello Ferraresi (San Remo, 20 April 1942 – Naples, 25 December 2006) an appreciated tenor, pupil of Mario del Monaco and the pianist Augusto Ferraresi, that we can see in a RAI video accompanying his father in Paganini recital ("Nel cor più non-mi sento"; "Adagio e Tamburino"; "Le Streghe"; "Sonatina in E minor" (recording: 4 January 1966; broadcast: 28 October 1966 RAI TV1).

Notable performances

1950: Genoa, for the 500th anniversary of the birth of Christopher Columbus, he performed Niccolò Paganini Violin Concerto No.1 in D major on Paganini's own violin, the 1742 Guarnieri "Il Cannone".
1950: San Remo, concert in the presence of Prince Philip, Duke of Edinburgh, where, as an encore was demanded by the audience, he performed the Paganini/Wilhelmj Concerto in D major.
1955: London, at Royal Festival Hall, he performed William Walton Violin Concerto in B minor under the composer's baton (16 November 1955).
1963: Torino, in RAI Auditorium he performed the Aram Kachaturian Violin Concerto in D, conducted by composer himself. Telecast by RAI Italian state television (only audio recording survive).
1963: Zurich, he performed the Beethoven Violin Concerto Op.61 -his only survived recording of this piece- (20 May 1963).
1965: Vatican, he gave a concert at Auditorium Pio di Via della Conciliazione, in the presence of Pope Paul VI and his Papal Court, playing Jean Sibelius Two Solemn Melodies Op.77. Telecast by RAI Italian state television TV1 (12 June 1965).
1971: Nice, he performed Alfredo D'Ambrosio Violin Concerto No.1 in B minor, to commemorate the 100th anniversary of the composer.

Recordings

Aldo Ferraresi – il Gigli del violino: The Great Italian Radio Recordings | 9CD box | GLV / RAI Trade ℗ & © 2006 -out of print- 
Aldo Ferraresi – The Gigli of the Violin – Complete recordings 1929-1973 | ‘'The Art of Violin 1 | 18CD box | Rhine Classics RH-001 ℗ & © 2016

Further reading
Estense, Aldo Ferraresi, il Gigli del violino, 17 November 2006.
Hall, Raymond, Riviera Chamber Music, The New York Times, 13 January 1934.
Kennedy, Michael, Portrait of Walton, Oxford University Press, 1998, p. 169.
La Villa, Gianluca, Souvenir of Aldo Ferraresi, 2001.
La Villa, Gianluca, Ricordo di Aldo Ferraresi-L'arte italiana del violino di un grande maestro del Novecento, Ferrara-Voci di una città, December 2001, rivista della Fondazione Cassa di Risparmio di Ferrara, p. 39-43.
La Villa, Gianluca, Aldo Ferraresi: L'arte italiana del violino, 2002.
Rhine Classics website: Reviews | RH-001 | Aldo Ferraresi - complete recorded legacy
La Villa, Gianluca, Ricordo di Aldo Ferraresi, Archi Magazine, May–June 2008, p. 30.
Woolf, Jonathan, Review: Aldo Ferraresi, La storia discografica del violino Vol.5 (IDIS 6366), Music-Web International, February 2003.
Woolf, Jonathan, Review: Aldo Ferraresi, Il Gigli del violino: The Great Italian Radio Recordings (RAI Trade 9CDs), Music-Web International, March 2007.
Woolf, Jonathan, Review: The Art of Violin 1 | Aldo Ferraresi – The Gigli of the Violin | 1929-1973 Unreleased Recordings (Rhine Classics RH-001, 18CDs), Music Web International, January 2017.
Greenbank, Stephen Review: RECOMMENDED Aldo Ferraresi – The Gigli of the Violin | Rec: 1929-1973 (Rhine Classics RH-001, 18CDs), Music Web International, May 2020.

References

External links 
 Deutschlandfunk broadcast dedicated to Aldo Ferraresi (15 June 2017), in German with English subtitles.
 Souvenir of Aldo Ferraresi

Male classical violinists
Italian classical violinists
Musicians from Ferrara
Jewish classical violinists
20th-century Italian Jews
1902 births
1978 deaths
20th-century classical violinists
20th-century Italian musicians
20th-century Italian male musicians